Orlando dos Santos Costa (born 26 February 1981) is a Brazilian former professional footballer who played as a striker.

Career
Orlando spent the majority of his career playing for the Belgian Pro League club Sporting Charleroi , making 151 appearances with 16 goals in seven seasons.

On 31 January 2010, Orlando moved to Genk on loan for the remainder of the 2010–11 season. In January 2011, he was sent on loan to Greek club Panthrakikos.

References

External links
 worldsoccerstats.com
 Profile at R. Charleroi S.C.
 Guardian Football

1981 births
Living people
Brazilian footballers
Brazilian expatriate footballers
Sampaio Corrêa Futebol Clube players
R. Charleroi S.C. players
Panthrakikos F.C. players
K.R.C. Genk players
Belgian Pro League players
Expatriate footballers in Belgium
Association football forwards
Expatriate footballers in Greece
People from São Luís, Maranhão
Sportspeople from Maranhão